This article provides details of international football games played by the China national football team from 2020 to present.

Results

2021

2022

2023

Head to head records
 after the match against .

See also
China national football team results and fixtures

Notes

References

Football in China
2020
2020s in Chinese sport